How to Survive a Funeral is the fourth studio album by Australian metalcore band Make Them Suffer. The album was released digitally on 19 June 2020, and had a physical release date three weeks later on 10 July. It was produced by Drew Fulk and Jeff Dunne. The album's release date was changed multiple times due to the COVID-19 pandemic. This is also the last album to feature keyboardist/vocalist Booka Nile. Metal Hammer named it as the 36th best metal album of 2020.

Track listing

Personnel 
Credits adapted from AllMusic.

Make Them Suffer
 Sean Harmanis – unclean vocals, clean vocals
 Nick McLernon – guitars, backing vocals
 Jaya Jeffrey – bass
 Jordan Mather – drums
 Booka Nile – keyboards, piano, clean vocals

Production Personnel
 Drew Fulk – production, engineering, drums
 Jeff Dunne – engineering, production

Charts

References 

2020 albums
Make Them Suffer albums